Henry Mancini: Pink Guitar is a compilation album of popular works by Henry Mancini, produced by James R. Jensen and released through Solid Air Records in 2004. Jensen asked guitar players on his record label to contribute some of their favorite compositions to the album. In 2005, the album won Jensen the Grammy Award for Best Pop Instrumental Album.

Reception

Track listing
 "Pink Panther Theme" (Henry Mancini), performed by Laurence Juber – 2:31
 "Moon River" (Mancini, Johnny Mercer), performed by Edward Gerhard – 2:21
 "The Days of Wine and Roses" (Mancini, Mercer), performed by David Cullen – 4:32
 "It's Easy to Say" (Mancini, Robert Wells), performed by Doug Smith – 3:39
 "Peter Gunn", performed by Pat Donohue – 1:55
 "The Thorn Birds", performed by Al Petteway – 5:28
 "The Sweetheart Tree" (Mancini, Mercer), performed by Mark Hanson – 3:55
 "What's Happening!!", performed by Mike Dowling – 3:22
 "Charade" (Mancini, Mercer), performed by Aaron Stang – 4:06
 "Dear Heart" (Mancini, Ray Evans, Jay Livingston), performed by Wayne Johnson – 4:57
 "Baby Elephant Walk", performed by William Coulter – 2:30
 "Two for the Road" (Mancini, Leslie Bricusse), performed by Amrit Sond – 2:56
 "A Shot in the Dark", performed by Mark Hanson and Doug Smith – 2:49

Personnel

 William Coulter – guitar
 David Cullen – guitar
 Pat Donohue – guitar
 Mike Dowling – guitar
 Edward Gerhard – guitar
 Mark Hanson – guitar
 James Jensen – executive producer, liner notes

 Wayne Johnson – guitar
 Laurence Juber – guitar
 Al Petteway – guitar
 Doug Smith – guitar
 Amrit Sond – guitar
 Aaron Stang – guitar

References

External links
Henry Mancini: Pink Guitar track notes

2004 compilation albums
Instrumental compilation albums
Henry Mancini tribute albums
Pop compilation albums
Grammy Award for Best Contemporary Instrumental Album